Lev HaSharon Regional Council (Mo'atza Azorit Lev HaSharon, lit. Heart of the Sharon Regional Council) is a regional council in the Central District of Israel. The council was established in 1984, unifying Hadar HaSharon and Northern Sharon regional councils, and covers 18 villages with a total area of 57,000 dunams and a population of 13,600.

It borders Hefer Valley Regional Council and Pardesiya to the north, Qalansawe, Tira and the West Bank to the east, Drom HaSharon Regional Council to the south and Even Yehuda and Netanya to the west. Until 1997 it also covered Tzoran, now a local council.

List of communities
Moshavim
Azri'el · Bnei Dror · Ein Sarid · Ein Vered · Geulim · Herut · Kfar Hess · Kfar Yabetz · Mishmeret · Nitzanei Oz · Nordia · Porat ·  · Tnuvot · Tzur Moshe · Yanuv
Community settlements
Ganot Hadar · Ye'af
Other villages
Kfar Avoda

International relations

Twin towns — Sister cities
Lev HaSharon region is twinned with:
 Tczew (since 1997)
 Witten (since 1979)

References

External links
Official website 

 
Regional councils in Israel
Sharon plain